The Banking Act 1979 (c 37) is (or was) an Act of the Parliament of the United Kingdom enacted in the wake of the Secondary banking crisis of 1973–1975 to extend the Bank of England's regulatory powers over lenders (banks) and to provide protections for their depositors.

See also

UK banking law
UK public service law

References 

United Kingdom Acts of Parliament 1979
Banking legislation in the United Kingdom
1979 in economics
Bank of England